Igors Sļesarčuks (born 31 March 1976) is a Latvian-Russian football coach and former player.

Career
He has played for FC Mashuk-KMV Pyatigorsk in the Russian First Division, for Skonto Riga, FK Venta and FK Ventspils in Latvia and other clubs from Belarus, Russia and Estonia.

Despite being born in Latvia and playing for Latvia national football team some time ago, he got a Russian passport and became a citizen of Russia in 2010.

Playing career

* - played games and goals

Honours
 Champion of Latvia (2):
1994, 2006

 Virsliga Top Scorer (1):
 2005

References

External links

1976 births
Living people
Footballers from Riga
Latvian footballers
Association football forwards
Latvia international footballers
Latvian expatriate footballers
Expatriate footballers in Estonia
Expatriate footballers in Russia
Expatriate footballers in Belarus
Latvian expatriate sportspeople in Russia
Skonto FC players
FC Slavia Mozyr players
FC Shakhtyor Soligorsk players
FK Venta players
FK Ventspils players
FC Volgar Astrakhan players
FC Mashuk-KMV Pyatigorsk players
FC Vitebsk players
FC Dnepr Mogilev players
Latvian football managers
Latvian expatriate football managers
Expatriate football managers in Belarus
FC Osipovichi managers
FC Slonim-2017 managers